Most Faithful Majesty was the title used by the Portuguese monarchs, from 1748 to 1910.

The sobriquet Most Faithful King was a title awarded by the Pope Benedict XIV – as spiritual head of the Catholic Church – in 1748, to the King John V of Portugal and to his heirs.

The title  remains attached to monarchs descended from whoever received the original sobriquet. The sobriquet can be awarded to either a king or a queen. The only European monarchy that has received the sobriquet was the now-defunct monarchy of Portugal.

Similar titles
The monarchs of other countries have received similar titles from the pope:
 Hungary: Apostolic Majesty (awarded )
 Venice: Most Serene Republic
 France: Most Christian Majesty (awarded )
 Spain: Most Catholic Majesty (awarded in 1493)
 England: Defender of the Faith (awarded in 1521 and revoked again c. 1530 by the Pope. Granted again in 1543 by the Parliament of England.)
 Germany: Defensor Ecclesiae (Protector of the Church; awarded to Holy Roman Emperors)

References

Royal styles
Superlatives in religion